The N8 road in Belgium is a road connecting Brussels and Koksijde, passing Ninove, Oudenaarde, Kortrijk, Ypres and Veurne.

The N8 is the old road from Brussels to the coast. In 2012, the extension was permanently cancelled.

See also
 Transport in Belgium

References

008